General Bishop may refer to:

Alec Bishop (1897–1984), British Army major general
Harry Gore Bishop (1874–1934), U.S. Army major general
Percy Poe Bishop (1877–1967), U.S. Army major general